Keep On Smilin' may refer to:

"Keep On Smilin'" (Wet Willie song)
"Keep On Smilin'" (John Paul Young song)